Pareiorhaphis regani is a species of catfish in the family Loricariidae. It is native to South America, where it occurs in the Amazon River basin in Brazil, with its type locality being listed as the Rio Negro basin in the state of Amazonas. The species reaches 12.1 cm (4.8 inches) in standard length and is believed to be a facultative air-breather.

References 

Loricariidae
Catfish of South America
Fish described in 1936
Fish of the Amazon basin
Freshwater fish of Brazil